The Society for the Prevention of Calling Sleeping Car Porters "George" (SPCSCPG) was founded as a joke by lumber baron George W. Dulany in 1914. Membership was open to all those whose first or last name was George. Its early members included Admiral George Dewey, who served as the group's first president, and writer George Ade. Dulany's secretary filled out and mailed more than 45,000 membership cards to people named "George" throughout the world, before Dulany retired from public life.

Rationale 

At the time, railway sleeping car porters in the United States were commonly referred to by the name "George" regardless of their actual name. The appellation may have stemmed from the name of George Pullman of the Pullman Company, which at one time manufactured and operated a large proportion of all the sleeping cars in North America. Porters were almost exclusively black, and the practice presumably derived from the old custom of naming slaves after their masters, in this case porters being regarded as servants of George Pullman.

Although founded as a joke, it nevertheless had some effects for all porters. In 1926, the SPCSCPG persuaded the Pullman Company to install small racks in each car, displaying a card with the given name of the porter on duty. Of the 12,000 porters and waiters then working for Pullman, only 362 turned out to be named George.

At its peak, the society had 31,000 members. It claimed to include several prominent Georges as members, including King George V of the United Kingdom, American baseball player George Herman "Babe" Ruth, Georgia Senator Walter F. George and French politician Georges Clemenceau.

See also
 Brotherhood of Sleeping Car Porters

References

Sources
 
 Tye, Larry. "Choosing Servility To Staff America's Trains", AFP Reporter (volume 21, number 1), 2003. Retrieved 4 December 2012.
 "Names make news." December 7, 1936, Time Magazine. Retrieved June 21, 2007.

1914 establishments in the United States
Organizations established in 1914
Pullman Company
Names
African-American history between emancipation and the civil rights movement